Andre Dillard (born October 3, 1995) is an American football offensive tackle for the Tennessee Titans of the National Football League (NFL). He played college football at Washington State, and was drafted by the Philadelphia Eagles 22nd overall in the 2019 NFL Draft.

College career

After redshirting his first year at Washington State, Dillard played only 3 games during his freshman season at left tackle.  Before his junior season, strength coach Marco Candido repositioned Dillard as the replacement for left tackle Joe Dahl.  During his next 2 seasons, he started all 26 games at left tackle.

Professional career

Dillard was drafted by the Philadelphia Eagles with the 22nd overall pick in the first round of the 2019 NFL Draft. He played in all 16 games as a rookie, starting four in place of injured starters.

Dillard entered training camp in 2020 as the projected starting left tackle. However on August 27, 2020, he suffered torn biceps and was ruled out for the season. He was placed on injured reserve on September 3.

Dillard entered training camp in 2021 in a battle with Jordan Mailata for the starting left tackle role, but began the season as a backup. Due to an absence by Lane Johnson, Dillard started four games from week 3 to week 6 at left tackle with Mailata having been moved to right tackle during that time. He was placed on the COVID list on December 20, 2021. He was removed from the COVID list on December 29.

The Eagles declined the fifth-year option on Dillard's contract on May 2, 2022, making him a free agent after the season. He was placed on injured reserve on September 6, 2022. He was activated on October 15.

Personal life
Grew up in Woodinville, WA. Mother: Jennifer Bollinger. Dillard's father, Mitch, also played football for Washington State Cougars as an offensive lineman from 1983 to 1986.

References

External links

Washington State Cougars bio

1995 births
Living people
American football offensive tackles
People from Woodinville, Washington
Players of American football from Washington (state)
Sportspeople from King County, Washington
Washington State Cougars football players
Philadelphia Eagles players